Edward Phillip Bailey was a member of the Parliament of Bermuda for Sandys North.

References

United Bermuda Party politicians
Members of the Parliament of Bermuda
Living people
Year of birth missing (living people)
20th-century Bermudian lawyers
Place of birth missing (living people)